Court Theatre or Royal Court Theatre may refer to:

Court Theatre (Chicago), Illinois
Court Theatre (New Zealand), Christchurch
Court Theatre (Pendley Tring), in the former stables of Pendley Manor in the UK
Court Theatre of Buda, Budapest, Hungary
Royal Court Theatre, London,
Royal Court Theatre, Liverpool, England
Court Theatre (film), a 1936 Austrian drama film

See also